Navalese is a variant of Southern Aragonese. The main characteristic of this local speech is the conservation of the articles system lo, la, los, las (that we can find in Hecho and Aragüés Aragonese, that some authors believe is an archaism), instead of the general system o, a, os, as.

Naval is a place located in El Grado, in the county of Somontano de Barbastro.

See also 
Aragonese dialects

Sources 
 Chesús de Mostolay EL ARAGONÉS EN EL SOMONTANO DE BARBASTRO: GLOSARIO DE VOCES Y EXPRESIONES.
 Chusé Inazio Navarro García SOBRE LA SUFIJACIÓN APRECIATIVA EN A LUECA, DE JUANA COSCUJUELA

References

External links 
Article about navalese local speech in the Gran Enciclopedia Aragonesa

Aragonese dialects